Fitzcarraldo is the second studio album by The Frames, released under the moniker The Frames DC to avoid confusion with the American band of the same name. Another version of the album would be published in 1996. The album was released  on ZTT Records in November 1995. The Frames' line-up for Fitzcarraldo features Glen Hansard on guitar and vocals, Colm Mac Con Iomaire on violin, Graham Downey on bass guitar and keyboards, Dave Odlum on lead guitar, Paul Brennan on drums and Noreen O'Donnell on backing vocals. They also featured Pete Briquette on keyboards & programming, Dee Armstrong on viola and Kevin Murphy on cello. It was recorded at Totally Wired Studios, Dublin by Ivan O'Shea and Tom Skerrit and produced and mixed by Pete Briquette.

The title track's name comes from Werner Herzog's 1982 film Fitzcarraldo which frontman Hansard describes as being about a man "pulling a ship over a mountain".

Track listing
 "Revelate" (4:02)
 "Angel At My Table" (3:54)
 "Monument" (3:33)
 "In This Boat Together" (4:20)
 "Giving It All Away" (4:10)
 "Say It To Me Now" (5:34)
 "Denounced" (4:13)
 "Red Chord" (4:27)
 "Roger" (3:23)
 "Fitzcarraldo" (11:35)
 "Your Face" (Hidden track)

Re-release
Fitzcarraldo was re-issued  by ZTT Records on 29 October 1996. The Frames' line-up for Fitzcarraldo features Glen Hansard on guitar and vocals, Colm Mac Con Iomaire on violin, Graham Downey on bass guitar and keyboards, Dave Odlum on lead guitar, Paul Brennan on drums and Noreen O'Donnell on backing vocals. They also featured Pete Briquette on keyboards & programming, Dee Armstrong on viola and Kevin Murphy on cello.

Tracks 6-11 were recorded at Totally Wired Studios, Dublin by Ivan O'Shea and Tom Skerrit and produced and mixed by Pete Briquette and are the same as those on the previous release. Tracks 1-5 were produced by Trevor Horn and engineered by Steve Fitzmaurice, except track 1, which was engineered by Tom Elmhurst at Westside (London). These tracks were re-worked for the re-issue and "Roger" was replaced by "Evergreen" and the track order changed. All tracks were mixed by Steve Fitzmaurice.

Track listing
 "Revelate" (3:48)
 "Angel At My Table" (3:50)
 "Fitzcarraldo" (6:03)
 "Evergreen" (4:29)
 "In This Boat Together" (5:17)
 "Say It To Me Now" (5:34)
 "Monument" (3:43)
 "Giving It All Away" (4:15)
 "Red Chord" (4:35)
 "Denounced" (4:27)
 "Your Face" (5:44)

Chart positions

References

External links
The Frames

1995 albums
1996 albums
The Frames albums
ZTT Records albums